Americium chloride can refer to:

Americium(II) chloride, AmCl2
Americium(III) chloride, AmCl3